Ignazio Bedini, S.D.B., is a former Roman Catholic archbishop emeritus of Ispahan (Isfahan), Iran.

Bedini was born in Sassomorello, near Modena, Italy, on 27 June 1939 and ordained as a priest of the Order of the Salesians of Saint John Bosco on 21 December 1969. He was appointed archbishop of Ispahan on 2 December 1989 and consecrated on 6 January 1990. He resided in Tehran. He is the head of the Catholic Bishops' Conference of Iran, though he is the only Latin Rite member of the conference, with the others being of the Armenian and Chaldean Rites.

Archbishop Bedini, retirement was announced by the Holy See effective 20 January 2015.

References

External links 

20th-century Italian Roman Catholic bishops
20th-century Roman Catholic bishops in Iran
Living people
1939 births
Salesians of Don Bosco
Italian expatriates in Iran
21st-century Roman Catholic bishops in Iran